Callitriche terrestris is a species of plant in the family Plantaginaceae found in Canada and in the eastern United States.

References

terrestris
Flora of Canada
Flora of the Eastern United States
Plants described in 1808
Freshwater plants